Jackson Brady (born 30 July 1997) is a professional New Zealand footballer who plays as a right-back for Chattanooga Red Wolves in the USL League One.

References

External links

Living people
1997 births
New Zealand association footballers
Association football defenders
Memphis 901 FC players
Cal Poly Mustangs men's soccer players
Memphis Tigers men's soccer players
USL Championship players
Chattanooga Red Wolves SC players